Tegirmech (previously known as Valakish) is a village in the Kadamjay District of Batken Region of Kyrgyzstan. The population amounted to 2,948 in 2021.

References 

Populated places in Batken Region